The Requiem by Herbert Howells was written in 1932, but first published almost fifty years later in 1981. It is set for unaccompanied choir with soloists, using a combination of texts from the traditional Requiem mass and other sacred sources: Psalm 23 ("The Lord is my shepherd"), Psalm 121 ("I will lift up mine eyes"), "Salvator mundi" ("O Saviour of the world" in English), "Requiem aeternam" (two different settings), and "I heard a voice from heaven".

After the death of his son Michael in 1935, Howells used much of the material from the Requiem in his work Hymnus Paradisi for soloists, large chorus and orchestra, which was first performed at the Three Choirs Festival in 1950. The original a capella Requiem remained unperformed until 1980, when the BBC Singers gave the premiere performance under John Poole, with the score published by Novello the following year.

See also
List of compositions by Herbert Howells

References

Compositions by Herbert Howells
Choral compositions
1932 compositions
Funerary and memorial compositions